Hoplias brasiliensis is a species of trahiras. It is a benthopelagic, tropical freshwater fish which is known from coastal rivers in northeastern Brazil, including the Paraguaçu River in Bahia, the Pardo River, the Jequitinhonha River in Minas Gerais and Espírito Santo, and the Contas River. Male H. brasiliensis can reach a maximum length of 20.3 centimetres.

It was originally described as Erythrinus brasiliensis by J.B. Spix and L. Agassiz in 1829.<ref name="Spix & Agassiz, 1829">Spix, J. B. von  and L. Agassiz  1829-31 [ref. 13] Selecta genera et species piscium quos in itinere per Brasiliam annos MDCCCXVII-MDCCCXX jussu et auspiciis Maximiliani Josephi I.... colleget et pingendso curavit Dr J. B. de Spix.... Monachii. Part 1: i-xvi + i-ii + 1-82, Pls. 1-48;, Part 2: 83-138, Pls. 49-101.</ref> It was listed as a valid species of Hoplias'' by O.T. Oyakawa in 2003.

References

External links
 Hoplias brasiliensis at www.fishwise.co.za.
 Hoplias brasiliensis at ITIS

Erythrinidae
Fish of the Jequitinhonha River basin
Taxa named by Johann Baptist von Spix
Taxa_named_by_Louis_Agassiz
Fish described in 1829